The striped bonito (Sarda orientalis)  is a species of marine perciform fish. They are called mackerel bonito.

References

Scombridae
Fish described in 1844